This is a list of pornographic magazines (sometimes called erotic magazines or adult magazines) — magazines that contain content of a sexual nature and are typically considered to be pornography.

For inclusion in this list, pornographic magazines must be, or have been, widely available as a printed publication and contain either hardcore or softcore pornographic images.

Marketed to heterosexual men 
These magazines may include female-male, female-female-male and/or female-female content.

Japan

 - 1984–94, thereafter Bejean 1994 - Eichi Shuppan, Japan, 
 Lemon People (Japan, 1981–1998)
 Manga Burikko (Japan, 1983–1986)

 Urecco - 1986, 
Million Shuppan, Japan
 Video Boy - 1984, Eichi Shuppan, Japan

Netherlands
 Chick (Netherlands, 1968–2009)
 Lolita (Netherlands, 1970–1987)
 [Rosie] (Netherlands)
 [Tuk] (Netherlands)

United Kingdom
 Asian Babes (Remnant Media, UK, launch 1983)
 Club International (1971; British sister of Club)
 Escort (Paul Raymond Publications, UK, 1980–present)
 Fiesta (Galaxy Publications, UK, 1966–2020)
 Mayfair (Paul Raymond Publications, UK)
 Men Only (Paul Raymond Publications, UK)
 Men's World (Paul Raymond Publications, UK)
 Knave (Galaxy Publications, UK, 1968–2015)
 Penthouse (1965–present) and Penthouse Variations Razzle (1983; British; focuses on amateur style pornography)
 Whitehouse (1974–2008; David Sullivan, later Gold Star Publishing)

United States
 Adam Film World (1966–1998) and Adam Film World Guide (1981–2008)
 Asian Fever -  U.S., launch 1999
 Barely Legal - Hustler Magazine, launch 1974
 Beaver Hunt, launch 1979
 Celebrity Skin (1986–??)
 Chic (1976–2001)
 Club Gallery - Montcalm, launch 1972
 Genesis - Magna, launch 1973
 Gent (Magna Publishing Group)
 High Society (1976)
 Hustler (1974–present)
 Juggs, launch 1981
 Leg Show (1980s–2012)
 Modern Man (1952–1967)
 Oui (1972–2008)
 Penthouse Forum Petite Perfect 10 Playboy (1953–2020)
 Score (1992;  Miami, Florida, focuses on large-breasted women)
 SCREW (Milky Way Productions, 1968)
 Swank 18eighteen magazine 18 year olds can start porn at 18 years of age in america.Others
 Aktuell Rapport (Norwegian, 1976–present), (Swedish, 1978–present)
 Bravo (Chilean, 1977–1982)
 Color Climax (Danish, 1966)
 Debonair (India, 1973)
 Lui (French, 1964–present)
 Playmen (Italian, 1967–2001)
 Private (1965–present) (Swedish, Spanish)

 Lads' mags 

 Nuts Zoo Weekly - Emap East  (UK, Australia, South Africa)

 Marketed to gay and bisexual men 
Gay pornographic magazines, sometimes known as adult magazines or gay sex magazines, contain content of a sexual nature, typically regarded as pornography, that relates to men having sex with men.

These magazines are targeted to gay and bisexual men, although they may also have some female readers, and may include male-male and occasionally male-male-female content and/or male-female content. Such publications provide photographs or other illustrations of nudity and sexual activities, including oral sex, anal sex, and other various forms of such activities. These magazines primarily serve to stimulate sexual thoughts and emotions. Some magazines are very general in their variety of illustrations, while others may be more specific and focus on particular activities or fetishes.

Prior to the 1970s, gay pornography was not widely distributed due to censorship laws. Non-pornographic "beefcake magazines" were widely available, and were generally purchased by gay men. From the late 1980s, a number of gay magazines and newspapers featured homoerotic nude or partially clothed male models but were not classified as pornography, for example Gay Times and QX Magazine. These have not been included here. See List of LGBT periodicals.The following is a list of gay pornographic magazines, with country of publication and approximate period of publication, where available:

Brazil
 G Magazine (Brazil, 1998–2014)

Germany
 Männer Aktuell (Germany, 1987–2017)

United Kingdom
 Vulcan (UK), made famous in a High Court test case by serial killer Dennis Nilsen (out of print), Edited by David Weston until Nigel Hatton took over in the mid 80's, published by Millivres Ltd, originally based in Camden Town, London (and the original producers of Gay Times Magazine - formerly known as Gay Reporter).
 Zipper (UK), Edited by Alex McKenna and Nigel Hatton, published by Millivres Ltd.
 Overload (UK), Edited by Nigel Hatton, published by Millivres Ltd.
 Him (UK), published by Millivres Ltd.

United States
 Black Inches (Mavety Media Group, U.S., 1996–2009), focused on African-American men
 Blueboy (Global Media Group, U.S.: 1975 - 3 issues; July/August 1975–August/September 1977 - bimonthly; November 1977 – 2007 - monthly)
 Bound & Gagged (U.S., 1987–2005)
 Drum (U.S., 1964–1967), December 1965 issue was the first U.S. magazine to show male frontal nudity
 Freshmen (U.S., 1982–2009)
 Honcho (U.S., April 1978–November 2009)
 Mandate (Mavety Media Group, U.S., monthly April 1975–October 2009)
 Manshots (U.S. film pornography magazine 1988–2001)
 Men (Specialty Media, U.S., monthly, October 1997–November 2009), began as Advocate Men in June 1984
 Pinups Magazine (U.S.)
 Playguy (U.S., October 1976–October 2009)

Japan
 Badi (Japan, 1994–2019)
 Barazoku (Japan, 1971–2008)
 G-men (Japan, 1995–2016)
 Samson (Japan, 1982)

 Marketed to heterosexual women 
 Filament (United Kingdom, 2009–2011)
 Playgirl,  (United States, 1973–2016)
 Viva (United States, 1973–1980)

 Marketed to lesbian women 
 On Our Backs (United States, 1984–2006)
 Quim'' (United Kingdom, 1989–2001)

See also 
 Fetish magazine
 Gay pornography
 List of performers in gay porn films
 List of pornographic movie studios

References 

Pornographic

Magazines